The Juke Joint Gamblers are an American rock and roll band founded in Portland, Oregon in 2005. They became popular  with 1950s and 1960s-style rock 'n' roll tracks, such as "Devils Cadillac" and "She Ain't Rockabilly".

Their music has been featured on Billetproof DVDs  as well as in the hot rod documentary The Movie: The Way It Really Was. They have appeared on Guitbox,  a popular public access television show in Portland.

Discography

Albums
Luck of The Draw - 2006
Gas Money - 2007
Hot Rods, Rock N' Roll, and The Devil - 2008

References

2005 establishments in Oregon
Musical groups established in 2005
Musical groups from Portland, Oregon